Spencer House, also known as Spencer Residence, located in Syracuse, New York was built in 1913.  Along with other Ward Wellington Ward-designed homes, it was listed on the National Register of Historic Places in 1997.

References

Houses in Syracuse, New York
National Register of Historic Places in Syracuse, New York
Houses on the National Register of Historic Places in New York (state)
Houses completed in 1913